Paired box gene 4, also known as PAX4, is a protein which in humans is encoded by the PAX4 gene.

Function 

This gene is a member of the paired box (PAX) family of transcription factors.  Members of this gene family typically contain a paired box domain, an octapeptide, and a paired-type homeodomain.  These genes play critical roles during fetal development and cancer growth.  The paired box gene 4 is involved in pancreatic islet development and mouse studies have demonstrated a role for this gene in differentiation of insulin-producing beta cells.

See also 
 Pax genes
 Maturity onset diabetes of the young type 9

References

Further reading

External links 
 

Transcription factors